The Anjouan myotis (Myotis anjouanensis) is a species of vesper bat. It is found only in Comoros.

Taxonomy and etymology
It was described as a new species in 1960 by French zoologist Jean Dorst.
Dorst described the species based on specimens that had been collected by Léon Humblot in 1886.
It has variably been considered a subspecies of the Malagasy mouse-eared bat.
However, in 1995 and 2005, it was published as a full species.
The species name "anjouanensis" means "belonging to Anjouan"—the island where the holotype was collected.

Range and habitat
It is found only on Anjouan island of the Comoros.
The individual observed in 2006 was captured flying through a tunnel surrounded by "heavily disturbed forest" and agricultural plots.

Conservation
As of 2019, it is evaluated as a data deficient species by the IUCN.
It is a rarely-observed species.
A single individual was captured in 2006, representing perhaps the first documentation of this species in over 120 years.

References

Mouse-eared bats
Anjouan
Taxonomy articles created by Polbot
Mammals described in 1960
Bats of Africa